Feild or Feilds is a surname. Notable people with the surname include:

Edward Feild (1801–1876), Anglican bishop, university tutor and examiner, and inspector of schools
John Feild (proto-Copernican) (1520–1587), English astronomer
John Feild (Puritan) (1545–1588), British Puritan clergyman and controversialist
JJ Feild (born 1978), English actor
Lewis Feild, American professional cowboy and rodeo performer
Maurice Feild (1905–1988), English painter and teacher
Nathan Field (1587–1620), sometimes spelled Feild, English dramatist and actor
Reshad Feild (1934–2016), English mystic, author, spiritual teacher, and musician
Theophilus Feild (died 1636), Anglican bishop
William A. Feilds (born c.1846–1852, died 1898), American legislator in the Tennessee House of Representatives

See also
 Feilde
 Field (surname)